Sherry Drive is an American hard rock band that formed in Bellevue, Nebraska in 2012. Their first album, One Lane Bridge, was released in April, 2014. Their second album Fly was released in August, 2016.

History

Formation, tours & accomplishments (2012–2016)

Sherry Drive has performed on the 2014 & 2015 Project Independent World Tour, played numerous live shows, and has released two studio albums. Sherry Drive has played shows with many bands over the years including Skid Row and Sick Puppies

They have achieved a #1 ranking for the Omaha area 2014-2016 on Reverb Nation. 
Sherry Drive has been ranked as high as #13 on The Indie website.
The band members all have military backgrounds or affiliation.

Musical style and influences
Sherry Drive is a blend of  metal, and alternative rock.  More specific subgenres they have been categorized as include metalcore, post-hardcore, and alternative metal.

Band members

Current members
 Anu Ratzburg – lead guitar, backing vocals (2012–present)
 Jeremey Meyer – bass, backing vocals (2012–present)
 Darin Schmelzer – drums, percussion (2012–present)
 Richard Ratzburg – rhythm guitar (2012–present)
 Cory Drennan - keyboards, piano <small>(2015–present)

Former members
 Rusty Perry – lead vocals (2012–2016)
 Soren Passey – drums, percussion  (2015)

 Timeline

Discography
One Lane Bridge EP (2013)
Checkmate | single (2016)
This Far | single (2016)
Fly (2016)

References

External links

Metalcore musical groups from Nebraska
American post-grunge musical groups
Musical groups from Omaha, Nebraska
People from Bellevue, Nebraska